Vorontsova may refer to:

12191 Vorontsova, main belt asteroid with an orbital period of 4.19 years
Anna Vorontsova (1722–1775), Russian lady in waiting, salonist, noble, cousin of the Empress Elizabeth of Russia
Elizaveta Vorontsova (1739–1792), mistress of Emperor Peter III of Russia
Evelina Vorontsova (born 1972), Russian/Dutch concert pianist and pedagogue
Valentina Vorontsova (born 1982), Russian female water polo player
Yekaterina Romanovna Vorontsova-Dashkova (1743–1810), friend of Catherine the Great and a major figure of the Russian Enlightenment
 (1845–1924), Countess Shuvalov